The paenula or casula was a cloak worn by the Romans, akin to the poncho (i.e., a large piece of material with a hole for the head to go through, hanging in ample folds round the body). This was originally worn only by slaves, soldiers and people of low degree; in the 3rd century, however, it was adopted by fashionable people as a convenient riding or travelling cloak, and finally, by the sumptuary law of 382 (Codex Theodosianus xiv. 10, 1, de habitu . . . intra urbem) it was prescribed as the proper everyday dress of senators, instead of the military chlamys. Thereafter, the toga was reserved for state occasions.

See also 
 Abolla
 Chasuble
 Pallium
 Phelonion

References

Roman-era clothing